André Fernand Brahic (30 November 1942 – 15 May 2016) was a French astrophysicist. He is known for his discovery (1984) of the rings of Neptune.

Biography

Brahic was born in 1942 in Paris. His family originated from the coal mining village of Petit-Brahic in the Banne commune of southern France. Brahic had stated that many of his ancestors died of silicosis, but his father quit the mines to work for the railway industry.

Brahic was first introduced into the field of astrophysics by Evry Schatzman, one of the foremost astrophysicist in France at the time.

In the 1980s, Brahic became a specialist in exploring the Solar System NASA Voyager program and the Cassini spacecraft.

Brahic was a member of the French Alternative Energies and Atomic Energy Commission and a professor at the University of Paris. He was also on the imaging team for the Cassini–Huygens spacecraft.

Brahic wrote several books, explaining astrophysics to the general audience. His last book "Worlds Elsewhere; Are We Alone" was published in 2015.

Brahic died of cancer in Paris on 15 May 2016. He was 73.

Discovery of the Rings of Neptune

The rings of Neptune were first discovered (as "arcs") in 1984 at European Southern Observatory and at Cerro Tololo Interamerican Observatory by André Brahic's and William Hubbard's team.

Brahic named the arcs, known today as parts of the Adams ring  - Liberté, Égalité, and Fraternité (Liberty, Equality, and Fraternity), after the national motto of France.

Awards and honors
In 1990, the asteroid 3488 Brahic was named in his honor.

In 2001, he was given the Carl Sagan Medal.

External links

 list of books written by Andre Brahic

References

1942 births
2016 deaths
20th-century French astronomers
French astrophysicists
Neptune
Academic staff of the University of Paris
Deaths from cancer in France
Planetary scientists